North Macedonia participated in the Junior Eurovision Song Contest 2016 which took place on 20 November 2016, in Valletta, Malta, under the provisional reference of "Former Yugoslav Republic of Macedonia". The Macedonian broadcaster Macedonian Radio Television (MRT) was responsible for organising their entry for the contest. Martija Stanojković was internally selected to represent North Macedonia with the song "Love Will Lead Our Way".

Background

Before Junior Eurovision
The Macedonian broadcaster announced on 19 July 2016, that they would be participating at the contest scheduled to take place on 20 November 2016, in Valletta, Malta. On 24 July 2016, MRT announced that they had internally selected Martija Stanojković to represent them in Malta. Her song for the contest, "Love Will Lead Our Way", was released on 10 October 2016.

Artist and song information

Martija Stanojković
Martija Stanojković (born 7 April 2004) is a Macedonian-Serbian singer. She represented Macedonia at the Junior Eurovision Song Contest 2016 in Valletta, Malta on 20 November 2016 with the song "Love Will Lead Our Way".

Martija finished second in the Serbian singing contest Pinkove Zvezdice, which is popular in the Balkan region. When she was four years old, she joined a dance club called Ultra, and she was dancing for seven years before she entered Pinkove Zvezdice. Martija is a fan of Justin Bieber.

Love Will Lead Our Way
"Love Will Lead Our Way" is a song by Macedonian singer Martija Stanojković. It represented Macedonia during the Junior Eurovision Song Contest 2016. It is composed and written by Aleksandar Masevski and Martija Stanojković. The official music video for the song was released on 10 October 2016.

At Junior Eurovision
During the opening ceremony and the running order draw which took place on 14 November 2016, Macedonia was drawn to perform seventh on 20 November 2016, following Bulgaria and preceding Poland.

The final was broadcast in Macedonia on MRT 1.

Final
At the beginning of her performance, Martija and her three dancers stood in the back of the stage in the shape of a pyramid, with Martija furthest back. When the music started, the dancers revealed Martija after about 15 seconds. The backdrop was lit up with red glitter in the beginning, which turned into different patterns that varied between the verse and the chorus. Despite being a favorite to win the contest, they only came 12th place.

Voting
During the press conference for the Junior Eurovision Song Contest 2016, held in Stockholm, the Reference Group announced several changes to the voting format for the 2016 contest. Previously, points had been awarded based on a combination of 50% National juries and 50% televoting, with one more set of points also given out by a 'Kids' Jury'. For the first time since the inauguration of the contest the voting procedure will not include a public televote. Following these results, three expert jurors will also announce their points from 1–8, 10, and 12. These professional jurors are: Christer Björkman, Mads Grimstad, and Jedward.

References

Junior Eurovision Song Contest
Macedonia
2016